Orbivestus homilanthus is a plant in the family Asteraceae.

Description
The capitula feature blue, mauve or purple flowers. The fruits are achenes.

Distribution and habitat
Orbivestus homilanthus is endemic to Kenya, where it is confined to Lamu and Kilifi Counties. Its habitat is bushland and forest margins up to the coastline. The species is threatened by coastal development for tourism.

References

Vernonieae
Endemic flora of Kenya
Plants described in 1867
Taxobox binomials not recognized by IUCN